Xavier Torres may refer to:

 Xavi Torres (born 1986), Spanish footballer
 Xavier Enrique Torres, Puerto Rican actor
 Xavier Navarro de Torres (born 1956), Spanish painter and sculptor